Can You Feel Me is the third studio album by American rapper Dru Down. It was released in 1996 through C-Note/Relativity Records. Recording sessions took place at Infinite Studios in Alameda, at Backroom Studios in Glendale, at Power Play Studios in Oakland, at The Grill in Emeryville, at Umoja Vibe, at Bosko's Digital Chicken And Beats in Los Angeles, and at Blackhole Studio near Los Angeles. Production was handled by DJ Fuze, Alonzo Jackson, Lev Berlak, The Whole 9, Maurice "Butch" Stewart, Big D the Impossible, Bosko, DJ Battlecat, DJ Daryl, Jamiel Hassan, Kenny McCloud, Soopafly and Terry T, with Chris "C&H" Hicks serving as executive producer. It features guest appearances from Luniz, Bootsy Collins, Eklipze, Knucklehead, L.V., Nick Nac, Poppa LQ and T-Luni. The album peaked at number 54 on the Billboard 200 chart and number 14 on the Top R&B Albums chart in the United States. It spawned two singles: "Can You Feel Me" and "Baby Bubba". Its lead single reached #92 on the Billboard Hot 100 singles chart.

Track listing

Samples
Track 2 contains elements from "Chameleon" by Herbie Hancock
Track 4 contains replayed elements from The Fat Boys' "Can You Feel It" written by Mark Morales, Damon Wimbley, Darren Robinson, Daniel Harris, Kurtis Walker and David Ogrin
Track 6 contains replayed elements from "The Smerphies Dance" written by Duane Hughes, Vaughan Mason and Russell "Butch" Deyo
Track 8 contains elements from "I'm a Hoe" written by Jalil Hutchins, John Fletcher and Larry Smith
Track 9 contains elements from "Freddie's Dead" by Curtis Mayfield
Track 17 contains replayed elements from "Ike's Mood" by Isaac Hayes

Personnel

Danyel "Dru Down" Robinson – main artist
William "Bootsy" Collins – featured artist (track 3)
Jerold "Yukmouth" Ellis III – featured artist (tracks: 10, 11, 17)
Kenneth "Poppa LQ" Green – featured artist (track 10)
Garrick "Numskull" Husbands – featured artist (tracks: 11, 17)
Larry "L.V." Sanders – featured artist (track 11)
Knuckle Head – featured artist (track 17)
Erick "Eklipze" Carson – featured artist (track 17)
Demetrius Nicole "Nic Nac" Lyles – featured artist (track 17)
Tamarr "T-Luni" Holloway – featured artist (track 17)
Christopher "C&H" Hicks – backing vocals & co-producer (track 5), executive producer
Dave Dalson – backing vocals (track 12)
David "DJ Fuze" Elliot – producer (tracks: 1, 4, 8)
Kevin "BattleCat" Gilliam – producer (track 2)
Alonzo Jackson – producer (tracks: 3, 16), recording (tracks: 3, 11, 13, 15, 16)
Lev Berlak – producer (tracks: 5, 6)
Daryl "DJ Daryl" Anderson – producer (track 7)
Jamiel Hassan – producer, recording & mixing (track 9)
Bosko Kante – producer, recording & mixing  (track 10)
John Rhone – producer (tracks: 11, 15)
Ontario D. Haynes – producer (tracks: 11, 15)
Maurice "Moe ZMD" Stewart – producer (tracks: 11, 15)
Terrence "Terry T." Butler – producer (track 12)
Priest "Soopafly" Brooks – producer (track 13)
Kenny McCloud – producer, recording & mixing (track 14)
Deon "Big D" Evans – producer (track 17)
Michael Denten – recording (tracks: 1, 4, 8, 12), mixing (tracks: 1, 3, 4, 8, 11-13, 15, 16)
Tim 'Flash' Mariner – engineering (track 2)
Michael Schlesinger – mix engineering (track 2)
Aaron McInnes – mix engineering assistant (track 2)
DeAndre Griffin – engineering assistant (track 3)
John "Indo" Neilson – recording (tracks: 5-7), mixing (tracks: 5-7, 17)
Jason Moss – recording (track 17)
Victor Hall – photography
David Bett – design

Charts

References

External links

1996 albums
Dru Down albums
Albums produced by Bosko
Albums produced by Soopafly
Gangsta rap albums by American artists
Albums produced by Battlecat (producer)